National Tertiary Route 703, or just Route 703 (or ) is a National Road Route of Costa Rica, located in the Alajuela province.

Description
In Alajuela province the route covers San Ramón canton (San Ramón, San Juan, San Rafael, Volio districts), Naranjo canton (San José, Cirrí Sur districts).

References

Highways in Costa Rica